West of Hot Dog is a 1924 American comedy film starring Stan Laurel.

Plot
Stan's stagecoach is robbed on his way to Hot Dog for the reading of his uncle's will.  Every time he raises his hands his pants fall down.  The robbers ride off and Stan tries to drive "Little Mustard" home.  The stagecoach horses run off and the stagecoach stands still.

The next day at the lawyer Jones's office, tenderfoot Stan learns that he inherits everything including a saloon.  If he dies, the estate goes to the two outlaws who have thrown him out the second story window twice.  Tenderfoot Stan goes to his saloon only to see a poker player shot and the place robbed.

Stan jumps on to Bad Mike's horse backward but manages to ride out of town.  The horse takes Stan to Bad Mike's house.  Mike and his henchmen arrive with the loot.  They keep trying to shoot Stan but keep hitting one another.  The Sheriff and the posse arrive by car.  Stan captures Mike and the Sheriff arrests him.. Now the girl has interest in Stan but he walks off.

Cast
 Stan Laurel as Stan, a tenderfoot
 Julie Leonard as Little Mustard - Sheriff's daughter (uncredited)
 Lew Meehan as Bad Mike (uncredited)

See also
 List of American films of 1924

References

External links

 

1924 films
American silent short films
American black-and-white films
1924 comedy films
Films directed by Joe Rock
Films directed by Scott Pembroke
1924 short films
Silent American comedy films
Articles containing video clips
American comedy short films
1920s American films